The Third and the Mortal were a Norwegian metal band from Trondheim, founded in 1992. The band started out as doom metal, mixing distorted guitars and heavy drumming with clean guitars and vocals from Kari Rueslåtten. The band went on to experiment with genres such as progressive rock, jazz, ambient, folk and electronica.

History
The pre-history of the band began in 1990, then known as Nightfall and playing melodic death metal, consisting of Rune Hoemsnes, Trond Engum, Geir Nilsen and vocalist Terje Buaas.

In 1992, Kari Rueslåtten replaced Buaas and, together with Jarle Dretvik and Finn Olav Holthe, they became The 3rd And The Mortal. Their first EP Sorrow was released in 1994 followed by the album Tears Laid in Earth in 1994.

After Rueslåtten's departure in 1995 the band had Ann-Mari Edvardsen join as vocalist. With her, the band released full-length albums Painting on Glass in 1996 and explored an even more experimental sound in 1997 with In This Room. Before In This Room, it was reported that the band's total sales were 50,000.

After the departure of Edvardsen and an absence of 5 years, the band returned in 2002 with Memoirs, an album with recordings made during previous years. A new female vocalist was found in Kirsti Huke, with Andreas Elvenes backing her up on a couple of tracks. Memoirs differs from previous albums by being more electronically based. After Memoirs, the band played in Mexico City on July 19, 2002, along with eight shows in Germany and the Netherlands during September and October 2002.

In 2004, the band released EPs And Rarities. This is a compilation consisting of the Sorrow and Nightswan EPs, the b-side of the Stream single and the bonus-track from the Japanese In This Room album. In 2005, the band split up, but not before releasing one last album, Project Bluebook: Decade of Endeavour, a compilation EP with two new studio tracks, another unreleased song performed live in 1998 and four different live versions of Mortal classics recorded on the European tour in 2002.

Members

Final line-up
Rune Hoemsnes – drums, keyboards, electronic percussion (1990–2005)
Trond Engum – electric and acoustic guitars (1990–2005)
Geir Nilsen – electric and acoustic guitars, keyboards, grand piano (1990–2002, 2003–2005)
Finn Olav Holthe – electric and acoustic guitars, keyboards (1992–2005)
Frank Stavem – bass (2002–2005)
Andreas Elvenes – vocals (2002–2005)
Kirsti Huke – vocals (2002–2005)

Former members
Terje Buaas – vocals (1990–1992)
Jarle Dretvik – bass guitar (1992–1994)
Kari Rueslåtten – vocals, keyboards (1992–1995)
Ann-Mari Edvardsen – vocals, keyboards (1995–1997)
Bernt Rundberget – bass guitar (1994–1998)
Sander S. Olsen – keyboards (2002–2003)

Timeline

Discography

Studio albums
 Tears Laid in Earth (1994)
 Painting on Glass (1996)
 In This Room (1997)
 Memoirs (2002)

Singles
 "Stream" (1996)

EPs
 Sorrow (1994)
 Nightswan (1995)

Demos
 The 3rd and the Mortal (1993)

Compilations
 EP's and Rarities (2004)
 Project Bluebook: Decade of Endeavour (2005)

References

External links
Official website

Norwegian doom metal musical groups
Norwegian progressive metal musical groups
Norwegian ambient music groups
Musical groups established in 1992
1992 establishments in Norway
Musical groups disestablished in 2005
2005 disestablishments in Norway
Musical groups from Trondheim